Morin Dawa Daur Autonomous Banner (Mongolian:      , Morin Dabaɣ-a Daɣur öbertegen jasaqu qosiɣu, Mongolian Cyrillic: Мориндаваа Дагуур өөртөө засах хошуу; Dagur: Morin Dawaa Daor weerie ixkiewu guasei), often abbreviated in official documents as Mo Banner, is one of three autonomous banners in Inner Mongolia, China, created for the Daur people. It lies on the Nen River, borders Heilongjiang province to the east, south and southwest and is under the administration of Hulunbuir City.

History 

In 1946, the region was organized Buxi Banner.

Morin Dawa Daur Autonomous Banner was created on August 15, 1958.

On April 1, 1969, the autonomous banner was placed under the jurisdiction of Daxing'anling Prefecture, before being moved back to Inner Mongolia's jurisdiction on July 1, 1979.

Geography 
The autonomous banner is located in the northeast of Inner Mongolia, along the west banks of the Nen River, at the confluence of the Greater Khingan Mountains and the Songnen Plains.

Morin Dawa Daur Autonomous Banner is bordered by Nehe and Nenjiang in Heilongjiang province to the east, borders Gannan County in Heilongjiang province to the southwest, and borders Oroqen Autonomous Banner and Arun Banner to the north and northwest.

Fauna 
A number of nationally protected species are found in the banner, including the Asian black bear, the sable, and reindeer.

Climate 

Administrative divisions 

Morin Dawa Daur Autonomous Banner administers 11 towns, 2 townships, and 2 ethnic townships.

Towns 

Townships 

Ethnic townships 

Demographics 
As of 2019, Morin Dawa Daur Autonomous Banner has a population of 316,398, a 1.0% decrease from 2018, the 32nd most populous of Inner Mongolia's 103 county-level divisions. This is a slight increase from 2004, when the autonomous banner had a population of 314,584.

Vital statistics 
As of 2018, the autonomous banner had a crude birth rate of 8.0 per thousand, and a crude death rate of 4.9 per thousand, giving the autonomous banner a rate of natural increase of 3.1 per thousand.

Urbanization 
As of 2018, Morin Dawa Daur Autonomous Banner has 86,905 residents living in urban areas, giving the autonomous banner an urbanization rate of 27.19%.

Ethnicity 
According to 2018 statistics compiled by the autonomous banner's government, there are 33,395 ethnic Daurs in the autonomous banner (10.45% of the autonomous banner's population), 6,851 ethnic Evenks (2.14% of the total population), and 337 ethnic Oroqen (0.11% of the total population).

According to a 2004 publication by the National Ethnic Affairs Commission, 80.3% of the autonomous banner's population is ethnically Han Chinese, 9.5% are ethnically Daur, and the remaining 10.2% belong to other ethnic minorities.

Economy 

Morin Dawa Daur Autonomous Banner has a gross domestic product of approximately 8,529,380,000 RMB as of 2019. Of this, 61.20% comes from the autonomous banner's primary sector, 5.90% comes from the secondary sector, and 32.91% comes from the tertiary sector.

As of 2019, the average annual disposable income for households in Morin Dawa Daur Autonomous Banner totals 15,825 RMB, a 7.9% increase from 2018. Average annual disposable income for urban households in Morin Dawa Daur Autonomous Banner totals 25,014 RMB, ranking last of all 101 county-level divisions in Inner Mongolia surveyed; the average annual disposable income for rural households totals 11,445 RMB, ranking 78th of the 90 county-level divisions in Inner Mongolia surveyed.

In 2018, consumer retail sales in the autonomous banner totaled 3,948,610,000 RMB, a 6.3% increase from 2017.

In 2019, the autonomous banner generated approximately 309.35 million RMB in public budget revenue, ranking 73rd out of the 103 county-level divisions in Inner Mongolia.

There are approximately 263,000 mobile phone subscriptions in the autonomous banner, reflecting approximately 83.12% of the autonomous banner's total population. There are approximately 49,000 internet subscriptions in the autonomous banner, reflecting approximately 15.49% of the total population. As of 2018, 99% of the population has television access, and 98% of the population has radio access.

Agriculture 
Morin Dawa Daur Autonomous banner is the third biggest grain producing county-level division of Inner Mongolia, producing 1,737,448 tons of grain in 2019. The autonomous banner ranks 40th of 103 county-level divisions in meat output, producing 24,801 tons in 2019.

Education 
There are 26 primary schools and 9 secondary schools in Morin Dawa Daur Autonomous Banner.

Culture 
Morin Dawa Daur Autonomous Banner has been recognized by the National Ethnic Affairs Commission as a center for hockey in China, and teams fielded from the autonomous banner have gone on to compete at the top level in China.In a 2018 field hockey tournament for secondary school teams, teams from Morin Dawa Daur Autonomous Banner won a number of different formats, including fielding teams which won first and second place in the men's secondary school format, and a team which won third place in the men's under-15 format.

Healthcare 
The autonomous banner's medical institutions have 1,020 beds, and are staffed by 1,334 personnel.

Transportation 
 of highways pass through the autonomous banner as of 2019.

Tourism 
In 2018, 975,000 tourists visited the autonomous banner, generating 910 million RMB in tourism revenue.

Morin Dawa Daur Autonomous Banner is home to tourist attractions of various types, including sites regarding the local Daur culture and the region's history, as well as natural landmarks.

The Chinese Daur Ethnic Park and the Daur Ethnic Museum are both located within the autonomous banner.

Portions of the  run through the autonomous banner.

References

County-level divisions of Inner Mongolia
Autonomous counties of the People's Republic of China
Hulunbuir